Scolochilus is a genus of longhorn beetles of the subfamily Lamiinae, containing the following species:

 Scolochilus lautus Monné & Tavakilian, 1988
 Scolochilus maculatus Monné, 1979

References

Phacellini